Vinícius José Paixão de Oliveira Júnior (born 12 July 2000), commonly known as Vinícius Júnior or Vini Jr., is a Brazilian professional footballer who plays as a winger for La Liga club Real Madrid and the Brazil national team. Considered one of the best players in the world, he is known for his dribbling skills, high pace and playmaking.

Born in São Gonçalo, Vinícius began his professional career at Flamengo, where he made his senior debut in 2017, at age 16. A few weeks later, Vinícius was the subject of a transfer to La Liga club Real Madrid, for whom he signed for in a £38 million deal, which was a national record for an U-18 player. The transfer was made effective after his 18th birthday, with Vinícius debuting for the club in 2018–19. By his fourth season, Vinícius had established himself as a prominent member in Real Madrid's squad, helping the club win the 2021–22 La Liga title and scoring the winning goal in Real Madrid's 2022 UEFA Champions League final win.

At his youth stage for Brazil, he was a key player in the victory at the 2015 South American U-15 Championship and 2017 South American U-17 Championship, finishing as leading goalscorer in the latter competition. He made his senior debut in 2021 and helped his nation to a runner-up finish at the 2021 Copa América and represented them at the 2022 FIFA World Cup in Qatar.

Club career

Early career
Vinícius Junior's football career began in the year 2006, when his father took him to the branch offices of Flamengo, in the neighborhood of Mutuá, in São Gonçalo where he lived. His club document described him as a left-back.

Hailing from a poor family, Vinícius went to live in Abolição with his uncle, Ulisses, to shorten the distance to Ninho do Urubu (the "Vultures' Nest"). He started to receive financial aid from Flamengo as well as aid from entrepreneurs.

Between 2007 and 2010, Vinícius attended futsal classes at Flamengo's school in São Gonçalo at the Canto do Rio, a famous club located in the centre of Niterói.

In 2009, when Vinícius was nine, he took a futsal trial for Flamengo. The club noted his potential, but given his young age, he was asked to come back the following year. However, he decided he wanted to play football, not futsal, and did not return. In August 2010, Vinícius passed his football tests at Flamengo.

Flamengo

Vinícius debuted for Flamengo on 13 May 2017 as an 82nd-minute substitute in a Brazilian Série A 1–1 draw against Atlético Mineiro. Two days later he extended his contract with the club from 2019 until 2022, with a significant salary increase and a buyout clause increase from €30 million to €45 million. This contract renewal was reported as being part of the transfer process of Vinícius to Real Madrid, an agreement reached between the two clubs in Gávea that week with an obligation to sell the young player in July 2018.

On 10 August 2017, Vinícius scored the first professional goal of his career in a Copa Sudamericana second round leg 2 match against Palestino in a 5–0 win for Flamengo. He scored one goal, 30 seconds after being substituted on in the 72nd minute. On 19 August, he scored his first Brazilian Série A goals for Flamengo, in a 2–0 win against Atlético Goianiense.

Real Madrid
On 23 May 2017, La Liga club Real Madrid signed a contract to acquire Vinícius, effective after his 18th birthday on 12 July 2018 (as age 18 is the minimum age for international transfer). He transferred for a reported fee of €46 million, which was at the time, the second most expensive sale of a player in the history of Brazilian football (behind only Neymar), the largest amount received by a Brazilian club for a transfer, and the highest amount ever paid by a club for a footballer under the age of 19. He was originally scheduled to return to Brazil on loan in July 2018.

2018–21: Development and adaptation to Spain
On 20 July 2018, he was officially presented as a Real Madrid player. He was issued squad number 28. He made his debut on 29 September, coming in as an 87th minute substitute in a goalless draw against Atlético Madrid. Vinícius made his first start on 31 October in a 4–0 Copa del Rey away victory against Melilla, contributing with assists for both Marco Asensio and Álvaro Odriozola in what Marca recognised as a Man of the Match performance. He scored his first goal on 3 November 10 minutes after coming on as a substitute in a 2–0 victory against Real Valladolid. He scored four goals between his debut on 29 September and 7 February 2019. On 6 March, he tore a ligament during a loss to Ajax, which ended his season.

On 11 December 2019, he scored his first UEFA Champions League goal in a 3–1 away win over Club Brugge in the 2019–20 season. On 1 March 2020, he scored the first goal in a 2–0 win for Real in El Clásico against Barcelona. He made 29 appearances during the league season, while scoring three goals, as Real Madrid won the 2019–20 La Liga.

On 6 April 2021, Vinícius scored two goals in a 3–1 win against Liverpool in the first leg of the 2020–21 UEFA Champions League quarter-finals. Real Madrid would advance to the semi-finals where they lost to eventual champions Chelsea.

2021–22: First-team breakthrough, second league title, UEFA Champions League winner
Vinícius started the 2021–22 season by scoring Real Madrid's fourth goal in a 4–1 away victory over Alavés on the opening day of the La Liga campaign. On 22 August, he scored a brace in a 3–3 draw against Levante coming off the bench, which earned him a first-team place, ahead of Eden Hazard. On 30 October, he scored twice as Real Madrid won 2–1 at Elche to go top of the La Liga table. The goals were his sixth and seventh of the league season and his eighth and ninth overall, surpassing his total output of six goals in all competitions during the 2020–21 season in just 14 matches. On 12 May 2022, he scored his first hat-trick for Real Madrid in a 6–0 victory over Levante.

On 28 May, he scored the only goal in a 1–0 win over Liverpool in the Champions League final to clinch Madrid their record 14th UEFA Champions League title. Vinícius ended the 2021–22 season as Real Madrid’s second-best goalscorer with 22 goals in all competitions, only behind his attacking partner Karim Benzema. For his performances Vinícius was named the inaugural Champions League young player of the season and included in the 2021–22 UEFA Champions League team of the season.

2022–23: FIFA Club World Cup Golden Ball
On 11 February, Real Madrid defeated Al-Hilal 5–3 in the 2022 FIFA Club World Cup final as Vinícius scored a brace to claim the tournament's best player award and his second Club World Cup title. On 21 February, Vinícius scored two first-half goals to power Real Madrid's 5–2 comeback win at Anfield against Liverpool in the first leg of their Champions League knockout stage round of 16 tie.

International career

2015–2019: Success at youth level
On 30 October 2015, Vinícius Júnior was called up for Brazil by coach Guilherme Dalla Déa for the South American U-15 Championship. Vinícius and Brazil won the U-15 title and he was the 2nd top-scorer of the tournament with seven goals. He was named player of the tournament and continued to perform which helped him convince Flamengo to sign him by the age of 16. On 24 June 2016, Vinícius was called up for a friendly against Chile U-17 and scored two goals and provided two assists in the 4–2 victory.

In March 2017, Vinícius debuted in the South American U-17 Championship for Brazil with a goal in a 3–0 victory over Peru. In the final stage, he scored two goals in a 3–0 win over Ecuador and two goals in a 3–0 victory over Colombia, securing Brazil's place in the 2017 FIFA U-17 World Cup in India, where Brazil (without Vinícius Júnior) eventually would finish third. After leading Brazil to win the South American U-17 Championship, Vinícius Júnior was named the tournament's best player and was top goal-scorer with seven goals.

2019–2022: Senior and World Cup debuts
On 28 February 2019, Vinícius was called up to the Brazil national team for the first time for friendlies against Panama and the Czech Republic. However, he suffered an injury while playing for Real Madrid, and David Neres was called up in his place in March. In May, he was excluded from Brazil's final 23-man squad for the 2019 Copa América by manager Tite. He made his senior international debut on 10 September, as a 72nd-minute substitute in Brazil's 1–0 defeat to Peru.

Vinícius was named in Brazil's 2021 Copa América squad by Tite on 9 June 2021, which would be held on home soil. He made a substitute appearance in his nation's 1–0 defeat to rivals Argentina in the final on 10 July.

On 24 March 2022, Vinícius scored his debut goal for the national team, in a 4–0 home win over Chile in a 2022 FIFA World Cup qualification match at the Maracanã Stadium.

On 7 November 2022, Vinícius was named in the Brazil squad for the 2022 FIFA World Cup by Tite. In the opening group match against Serbia on 24 November, he set-up Richarlison's second goal to help Brazil to a 2–0 victory. He scored his first FIFA World Cup goal in a 4–1 win against South Korea in the round of 16 on 5 December, also setting up Lucas Paquetá's goal, helping Brazil qualify for the quarter-finals, where they were eliminated by Croatia four days later following a 4–2 penalty shoot-out loss after a 1–1 draw.

Style of play and reception

Shortly after his arrival at Real Madrid in July 2018, ESPN journalist Dermot Corrigan described Vinícius as a "zippy left winger or second striker". A versatile player, although he is usually deployed on the left flank, he is capable of playing anywhere along the front line, and has also been used on the right or in the centre. Possessing explosive acceleration, and excellent pace, agility, balance, technique, flair, dribbling skills, and close control at speed, as well as significant power, physical strength, and trickery on the ball, despite his slender build, he is known for his movement, energy, ability to run at defences, change direction quickly, and beat opponents in one on one situations while in possession of the ball.

Regarded as a promising young player, he is considered to be a diminutive, dynamic, intelligent, hard-working, and nimble winger, with a low centre of gravity, as well as impressive passing and awareness. Moreover, he is known in for his eye for the final ball, and ability to provide assists to teammates; although he is also capable of scoring goals himself, his shooting and goalscoring have been cited by pundits as areas in need of improvement, as his lack of end product was often a source of criticism in the media in his first few seasons at Real Madrid. In June 2017, Vinícius appeared at 39th place on The Telegraph's list of the best under-21 players in the world. He was the only player playing in South America at the time to appear on the list. In November 2018, former Argentina international frontman José Luis Calderón credited Vinícius' "general enthusiasm, his ability to make things happen, the joy and good vibrations he transmits, his speed, the fact he's different and the fact he's daring. To sum up, he has a spark that could be used by a team that has been plain in recent matches". In his youth with Flamengo, he was criticised, however, by several football figures, fans, and the press for "doing too many tricks," and for "[t]oo much individualism, not enough teamwork."

During the 2021–22 season, Vinícius had a breakthrough season with Real Madrid, and his goal scoring and assist output increased dramatically, enabling him to form an effective offensive partnership from the left wing with striker Karim Benzema. Regarding his change in form, Vinícus commented in December 2021: "I think I've improved in many things, but above all in my calmness in my play, I'm doing things with more tranquillity and more quality too." The club's manager Carlo Ancelotti also praised him for his defensive work-rate and positioning, in addition to his creative abilities and talent, noting that he was able to improve upon his tactical knowledge and physical condition throughout the course of the season, as well as his finishing. His performances led the Spanish press to compare him to compatriot Neymar. Following his goal in Real Madrid's victory in the 2022 Champions League final, Neymar himself described Vinícius as "the best player in the world." Later that month, Ed McCambridge of FourFourTwo ranked Vinícius as the second–best left winger in the world.

Vinícius has been subject to racist slurs and chants from football fans in Spain, including an effigy of him being hanged from a bridge in Madrid.

Personal life
Vinícius is Catholic.

Career statistics

Club

International

Scores and results list Brazil's goal tally first.

Honours
Real Madrid
La Liga: 2019–20, 2021–22
Supercopa de España: 2019–20, 2021–22
UEFA Champions League: 2021–22
UEFA Super Cup: 2022
FIFA Club World Cup: 2018, 2022

Brazil U15
South American U-15 Championship: 2015

Brazil U17
South American U-17 Championship: 2017
BRICS U-17 Football Cup: 2016

Individual
Copa São Paulo de Futebol Júnior Best Left-Winger: 2017
South American U-17 Championship Best Player: 2017
La Liga Player of the Month: November 2021
UEFA Champions League Team of the Season: 2021–22
UEFA Champions League Young Player of the Season: 2021–22
 La Liga Team of the Season: 2021–22
 FIFA Club World Cup Golden Ball: 2022

References

External links

Profile at the Real Madrid CF website

2000 births
Living people
People from São Gonçalo, Rio de Janeiro
Sportspeople from Rio de Janeiro (state)
Brazilian footballers
Association football wingers
Association football forwards
CR Flamengo footballers
Real Madrid CF players
Real Madrid Castilla footballers
Campeonato Brasileiro Série A players
La Liga players
Segunda División B players
Brazil youth international footballers
Brazil under-20 international footballers
Brazil international footballers
2021 Copa América players
2022 FIFA World Cup players
Brazilian expatriate footballers
Brazilian expatriate sportspeople in Spain
Expatriate footballers in Spain
UEFA Champions League winning players